Youri Baas (born 17 March 2003) is a Dutch professional footballer who plays as a left-back for Jong Ajax.

Club career
Born in Oostvoorne, Baas began his football career with local club OVV before moving to the youth department of Excelsior in 2012. He joined the youth academy of Ajax in 2017. Baas made his official debut with Jong Ajax in a 2–2 Eerste Divisie tie with De Graafschap on 11 December 2020, coming on as a substitute in the 86th minute for Naci Ünüvar. On 26 March 2021, he signed a contract extension keeping him in Amsterdam until 2024.

International career
Baas gained several caps for Netherlands national youth team, most notably seven caps for the U17 side.

References

External links
 Profile at the AFC Ajax website
 
 Ons Oranje U17 Profile
 

2003 births
Living people
Footballers from South Holland
Dutch footballers
Netherlands youth international footballers
Jong Ajax players
Eerste Divisie players
Association football fullbacks